The 1997 NCAA Division III men's basketball tournament was the 23rd annual single-elimination tournament to determine the national champions of National Collegiate Athletic Association (NCAA) men's Division III collegiate basketball in the United States.

The field contained sixty-four teams, and each program was allocated to one of four sectionals. All sectional games were played on campus sites, while the national semifinals, third-place final, and championship finals were contested at the Salem Civic Center in Salem, Virginia.

Illinois Wesleyan defeated Nebraska Wesleyan, 89–86, in the final, clinching their first national title. 

The Titans (24–7) were coached by Dennie Bridges. Bryan Crabtree, also from Illinois Wesleyan, was named Most Outstanding Player.

Championship Rounds
Site: Salem Civic Center, Salem, Virginia

See also
1997 NCAA Division III women's basketball tournament
1997 NCAA Division I men's basketball tournament
1997 NCAA Division II men's basketball tournament
1997 NAIA Division I men's basketball tournament
1997 NAIA Division II men's basketball tournament

References

NCAA Division III men's basketball tournament
NCAA Men's Division III Basketball
Ncaa Tournament
Sports competitions in Salem, Virginia